Edward James "Ox" Clemons (c. 1903 – March 1966) was an American football coach. He served as the head football coach at Edward Waters College in Jacksonville, Florida from 1929 to 1932 and again in 1965, Lane College in Jackson, Tennessee from 1934 to 1948, Morris Brown College in Atlanta, Georgia from 1950 to 1962, and Jackson State University in Jackson, Mississippi in 1963.

Clemons played college football as a tackle, first as Paul Quinn College in Dallas, Texas, from 1922 to 1924 under brothers Fred T. Long and Harry Long.  In 1926, Chief Aiken, head coach at Atlanta University, convinced Clemons and several other Paul Quinn players to leave Texas for Atlanta.  Clemons ultimately ended up at Morris Brown College, where he started alongside Billy Nicks.

Clemons died in March 1966, in Jacksonville.

Head coaching record

References

Year of birth uncertain
1966 deaths
American football tackles
Edward Waters Tigers football coaches
Jackson State Tigers football coaches
Lane Dragons football coaches
Morris Brown Wolverines football coaches
Morris Brown Wolverines football players
Paul Quinn Tigers football players
African-American coaches of American football
African-American players of American football
20th-century African-American sportspeople